Eucithara albivestis is a small sea snail, a marine gastropod mollusk in the family Mangeliidae.

Description
The shell length varies between 5 mm and 8 mm.

Distribution
This marine species occurs off Japan, the Philippines and Fiji.

References

  Tucker, J.K. 2004 Catalog of recent and fossil turrids (Mollusca: Gastropoda). Zootaxa 682:1-1295.
 

albivestis
Gastropods described in 1934